Soltsy-2 (also spelled Sol'tsy, Soltsy, Solcy, Solcy 2)  is an air base in Novgorod Oblast, Russia located 2 km north of Soltsy and 72 km southwest of Novgorod.  It contains large aircraft revetments, with a separate compound of 9 hardened areas about 1 mile from the airfield.

The base is home to the 40th Composite Aviation Regiment which flies the Tu-22M as part of the 22nd Guards Heavy Bomber Aviation Division.

In 1992, the headquarters of the 326th Heavy Bomber Aviation Division (326 TBAD) arrived from Tartu Raadi Airfield in newly independent Estonia. In 1998 the division headquarters was moved to Ukrainka in the Far East.

The 840th Heavy Bomber Aviation Regiment (840 TBAP) flew Tupolev Tu-22M aircraft from November 1951 through to 2010. The regiment was disbanded in 2010 following the changes initiated by the Russian military reforms from 2008.

Airfield is properly maintained for occasional training of Russian Air Force and to service governmental flights in Novgorod region.

Natural Resources Defense Council lists Soltsy-2 as a nuclear weapons facility.

References

External links
http://airbase.ru/squad/russia/da/

Soviet Air Force bases
Soviet Long Range Aviation
Russian Air Force bases